The Confederation of African Football (CAF) section of the 1970 FIFA World Cup qualification saw teams competing for one berth in the final tournament in Mexico.

Thirteen nations in total entered the qualifying stage but FIFA rejected the entries of Guinea and Zaire, leaving 11 nations to contest the qualifying spot.

Format
There would be three rounds of play:
First Round: Ten teams were paired up to play knockout matches on a home-and-away basis, with Ghana receiving a bye to the Second Round. The winners (determined by aggregate score) would advance to the Second Round.
Second Round: The six teams were paired up to play knockout matches on a home-and-away basis. The winners would advance to the Final Round.
Final Round: The three remaining teams played against each other on a home-and-away basis. The group winner would qualify.

Qualification

First round

|}

The aggregate score was tied 6–6, but Sudan advanced to the Second Round as they scored more goals in the second match.

The aggregate score was tied 2–2, and since extra time was not played in the second match, a play-off on neutral ground was played to decide who would advance to the Second Round.

Morocco advanced to the Second Round, via the play-off.

Tunisia advanced to the Second Round.

Nigeria advanced to the Second Round.

Ethiopia advanced to the Second Round.

Second round

|}

The aggregate score was tied 0–0, and a play-off on neutral ground was played to decide who would advance to the Final Round.

Morocco advanced to the Final Round, by winning a coin toss.

Sudan advanced to the Final Round.

Nigeria advanced to the Final Round.

Final Round

Morocco qualified.

Qualified teams

1 Bold indicates champions for that year. Italic indicates hosts for that year.

Goalscorers

4 goals

 Garba Okoye

3 goals

 Houmane Jarir
 Emment Kapengwe
 Babiker Santo

2 goals

 Zerga Geremew
 Asmeron Germa
 Mohammed El Filali
 Mohammed Lawal
 Olumuyiwa Oshode
 Nasr El-Din Abbas
 Ismaeil Bakhit
 Ali Gagarin
 Ezzedine Chakroun

1 goal

 Boualem Amirouche
 David Ayo
 Dieudonné Bassanguen
 Norbert Owona
 Kebede Asfaw
 Emmanuel Feseha
 Mengistu Worku
 Abekah Ankrah
 Emmanuel Ola
 Mahmoud Al-Jahani
 Ahmed Ben Soed
 Mohamed Koussa
 Hassan Akesbi
 Driss Bamous
 Boujemaa Benkhrif
 Ahmed Faras
 Cherkaoui Hafnaoui
 Moulay Khanousi
 Joseph Aghoghovbia
 Peter Anieke
 Sam Garba
 Sebastian Broderick Imasuen
 Sunday Ineh
 Augustine Ofuokwu
 Samuel Opone
 Emile Pierre Diéme
 Abdoulaye Makhtar Diop
 Jadallah Kheirelseid
 Hasabu El Sagheir
 Abdelkfi Elsheikh
 Jagdoul
 Awad Koka
 Bushra Wahba
 Tahar Chaïbi
 Abdesselem Cheman
 Godfrey Chitalu
 Sandy Kaposa
 Dickson Makwaza

References

External links
 African Zone at FIFA.com

CAF
FIFA World Cup qualification (CAF)
Qual